Blondie is the first of two TV series based on the comic strip by Chic Young. The show first aired on January 4, 1957 on NBC and ran for one season. Pamela Britton starred in the title role and Arthur Lake played Blondie's husband Dagwood Bumstead, reprising his role from the Blondie film series. 

A pilot episode was filmed in 1954 with Hal Le Roy as Dagwood opposite Britton's Blondie. The series was released in its entirety on September 25, 2018 by ClassicFlix. As of 2021, it airs on Tubi.

Cast 
Arthur Lake as Dagwood Bumstead 
Pamela Britton as Blondie Bumstead
Florenz Ames as J.C. Dithers
Ann Barnes as Cookie Bumstead
Stuffy Singer as Alexander Bumstead
Harold Peary as Herb Woodley
Elvia Allman as Cora Dithers 
Lucien Littlefield as Mr. Beasley
Hollis Irving as Mrs. Woodley

Episodes

Further reading
Blondie Goes to Hollywood, by Carol Lynn Scherling. Albany, 2010. BearManor Media. .

References

External links
 

1957 American television series debuts
1957 American television series endings
1950s American sitcoms
Black-and-white American television shows
English-language television shows
NBC original programming
Television shows based on comic strips
Blondie (comic strip)